Kuntur Pata (Quechua kuntur condor, pata  step, bank of a river,  "condor step" or "condor bank", Hispanicized spelling Condorpata, Cóndorpata) is a  mountain in the Andes of Peru. It is located in the Puno Region, Melgar Province, on the border of the districts of Antauta and Nuñoa. Kuntur Pata lies north of Pirwani. The Pirwani River originates near the mountain. It is a right tributary of the Crucero River whose waters flow to Lake Titicaca.

References

Mountains of Peru
Mountains of Puno Region